Martin Herrmann (born 20 March 1970) is a retired German swimmer who won two medals at the 1989 European Aquatics Championships. He also competed in the 100 m and 200 m butterfly at the 1988 and 1992 Summer Olympics, he placed 11th in the 100 m butterfly.

References

1970 births
German male swimmers
Swimmers at the 1988 Summer Olympics
Swimmers at the 1992 Summer Olympics
German male butterfly swimmers
Olympic swimmers of West Germany
Olympic swimmers of Germany
Living people
European Aquatics Championships medalists in swimming
Sportspeople from Cologne
21st-century German people
20th-century German people